This article contains detailed information on a number of student groups at Dartmouth College. For more information on athletic teams, please see Dartmouth College athletic teams.  For more information on college publications, please see Dartmouth College publications.

Student Governance

Dartmouth Student Government (DSG)
Dartmouth Student Government (DSG) is the official elected Student Government for all Dartmouth undergraduate students that represents student concerns to the administration and outside community groups, whether that’s around mental health, dining and food insecurity, elections, or infrastructure and housing. Any issue affecting the quality of undergraduate life or education falls within the jurisdiction of DSG. To this end, DSG lends a voice to student concerns and opinions; plays an active role in shaping College policy; protects student rights and freedoms; promotes and finances undergraduate activities; fosters school unity and pride; and serves as a forum for the discussion and advancement of ideas. Each year, twenty-four student Senators are elected to serve across the four undergraduate class years, in addition to the Student Body President and Vice President.

A cappella singing groups

The Dartmouth Aires

Dartmouth College's oldest a cappella singing group, the Aires were originally formed as the Injunaires in 1946 as an offshoot of the college Glee Club; the Dartmouth Aires broke with the Glee Club in the late 1970s.

Although the Aires usually have about sixteen members, group numbers vary on a term-to-term basis. Auditions are held at the beginning of every fall term. Members of the Aires pick what songs to arrange based on the group's tastes.  Because the Aires are such a diverse group, they end up singing a lot of different styles. Currently, much of their repertoire consists of popular songs from the 1980s, 90s, and 00s, but it also includes many traditional Dartmouth songs, a few 1950s and 1960s tunes, selected hip hop tracks, and the occasional musical theater piece.

The Aires perform an average of two or three times a term at Dartmouth. They frequently take weekend road-trips, singing and reveling at other colleges, performing for high school music festivals, and entertaining at Dartmouth alumni clubs. Every winter break, the Aires tour the Eastern Seaboard, while travelling further afield every spring.  Recent spring tours have taken them to Costa Rica, Paris, Italy, Colorado, a few of the Hawaiian Islands, Florida, and California.

Recent Aires accolades include winning the Contemporary A Cappella Recording Award (CARA) for Best All-Male Collegiate Album for both their 2003 and 2005 album releases, as well as selection for Varsity Vocals' Best Of Collegiate A Cappella compilation CD in 2003, 2005 and 2008, and selection for the Voices Only compilation CD in 2005, 2006 and 2008.  Their most recent album, Extraordinaire, is featured on both compilations. They were scheduled to release a new album, fresh aire, in June 2011.

In 2011, they competed in season 3 of The Sing Off, a national reality show. Out of 16 original contestants, they have made it into the top three, finishing as first runner-up.

The Dartmouth Brovertones
The Dartmouth Brovertones are Dartmouth's second oldest all-male a cappella group, founded in 1993.  The group was originally named Final Cut, and was traditionally known for singing popular songs from the 80's and 90's. The Brovertones (or Bros) have since expanded their repertoire to include modern hits. Brovertones' repertoire includes a varied mix of approximately 30 songs ranging from "House of the Rising Sun" to a mash-up of "Bailando" and "Despacito". The group has four albums, including Bro & Tell, released in May 2012.

The Dartmouth Brovertones' winter tours have included Boston, New York, Philadelphia, Washington DC, Louisville, Nashville and Atlanta. They have also performed at Brown University, Princeton University, Tufts University, Georgetown University, Smith College, Middlebury College, Trinity College, Yale University, and WPI. They hold competitive auditions every fall in conjunction with other campus a cappella groups.

In a March 2018 charity competition sponsored by Kappa Delta sorority, the Dartmouth Brovertones edged out every other participating performing arts group on campus (including The Dartmouth Aires), cementing their status as 2018's most popular Dartmouth a cappella group per popular vote. In Fall 2018, the Brovertones released the album Bro Ties on streaming platforms, featuring Brovertones from five different class years making music with their mouths.

The Dartmouth Cords
The Dartmouth Cords are an all-male singing group founded in 1996 which usually consists of around 20 members. They are known for wearing corduroy to every performance. Their repertoire includes pop, rock, hip-hop, and traditional Dartmouth songs. Voice parts include tenors, baritones, basses and vocal percussionists. The group incorporates choreography, comedic skits, and visual media to enhance their shows. These fine gentlemen love three things above all else: good music, good times, and a good pair of corduroys.

The Cords have an annual tour during winter break where they travel to sing at colleges and alumni venues throughout the country. Past tours have included Florida, the Midwest and numerous places in the Northeast. During the spring term the group hold sing-outs where Cords alumni from past years come back to Dartmouth to sing Cord's songs. In the spring of 2011 the Cords traveled to South Korea for their first international tour. This tour consisted of singing at South Korean high schools and colleges including Yonsei University where they opened for the US Ambassador to South Korea before a panel discussion.

Their CD Elements of Style, released in 2002, has won awards from the nation collegiate a cappella organizations CASA and Varsity Vocals. They have had a song featured in the Best of Collegiate A Cappella compilation album. Their other recordings include Against the Grain (1999), Accordingly (1997), No Size Fits All (2008), and Tailor Made (2014).

Auditions for the Cords are held at the beginning of every fall term.

Dartmouth Bartenders
The Dartmouth Bartenders are an all-male a cappella group focusing on mixing diverse styles of music into self-made mash-ups. They were founded by a group of seven members in 2010 and were originally known as Dartmouth Taal, which was a South Asian Fusion a cappella group. The group was founded with the goal of blending popular American music with Bollywood tunes. Their arrangements vary from somber to fun but try to maintain a coherency between the blended songs.

Dartmouth Decibelles
The Dartmouth Decibelles are the oldest all-female a cappella group at Dartmouth College. They were created with twelve founding members as the Dartmouth Distractions in 1976 and later changed their name to Woodswind before finally settling on the Dartmouth Decibelles a few years later. The group began as an offshoot of the Dartmouth Glee Club. Although they are no longer affiliated, many of the group's members are prominently featured as part of the Glee Club.

The group typically has between 16 ad 20 members at a time, though the number of active members varies on a term-by-term basis due to the nature of the college's D-Plan. They hold auditions for new members at the beginning of each fall term.

The Decibelles are known for singing music across all genres and their repertoire includes Adele, fun., Earth, Wind & Fire, and Etta James. They perform frequently on Dartmouth's campus as well as at alumni clubs and other undergraduate institutions. Their tours have included New York City, Boston, Montreal, and London.

In 2007, the Decibelles' cover of Everytime We Touch by Cascada was featured on Voices Only, a college a cappella compilation CD. They have produced seven albums: Conversing (1993), Belley (1996), Iridescence (1998), Vintage (2001), Platinum (2004), Distraction (2007), and Saved by the Belles (2012).

Dartmouth Rockapellas
The Dartmouth Rockapellas, often called "The Rocks", were founded on February 7, 1989, with a musical and political purpose: to spread social awareness by performing "freedom songs". Members have included actresses Aisha Tyler (a founding member) and Mindy Kaling (class of 2001).

The Rockapellas has typically consisted of around 16 members. Their repertoire of over 100 songs includes hip-hop, country and pop. They have toured the United States, the Bahamas, Hawaii, and Anguilla in the British West Indies. They most recently toured Nepal where they supported The Nepal Foundation and hiked the Annapurna Circuit in the Himalayas. They have competed in the International Championship of Collegiate A Cappella ICCA tournament, and have been featured on Varsity Vocals' Best Of Collegiate Acappella CD. The Rockapellas' recordings include "Live Free" 2011, "Testimony" 2009, BARE 2003, Velvet Rocks 1999, Think On These Things 1996, Off the Track 1994, and Definitions 1992.

Dartmouth Subtleties
The Dartmouth Subtleties is an all-female a cappella group on campus,  Founded in the winter of 1998. They are known as a musically talented group of independent women who emphasize musical innovation through arrangements and creative performances.  Extensive choreography, new sounds, colorful costumes, and uproarious skits have all become part of the Subtleties' style.

Their repertoire includes pop, rap, rock, and other musical genres. Membership varies from term to term but is usually between 11 and 16 members.  Auditions are held at the beginning of every fall term and as necessary.

The Dartmouth Subtleties are currently finishing their second album, the follow-up to their 2003 debut, Irony. The Subtleties tour the country every winter, performing everywhere from New York City to Colonial Williamsburg to Orlando, Florida.  During their 2007 winter tour, they went to Washington D.C. and, in addition to performing at local hospitals and events, sang at the White House and the State Department.

Dartmouth Dodecaphonics
The Dartmouth Dodecaphonics ("Dodecs") is Dartmouth's oldest and premier gender-inclusive a cappella group. The group was created in 1984 by 12 founding members (hence, "Dodeca"). They sing mainly contemporary pop music, with arrangements by such artists and groups as Queen, Maroon 5, Whitney Houston, Evanescence, and Alanis Morissette.  They also sing doo-wop favorites, 1980s songs, traditionals, Dartmouth songs, and sometimes disco. The Dodecs was the first Dartmouth group to be recognized on Best Of Collegiate A Cappella, a compilation a cappella CD, with their rendition of the Smashing Pumpkins' "Drown." Dodecs released their album Hooked on Dodecaphonics in 2012 and were planning to release a new album in the fall of 2016.

They have competed in the International Championship of Collegiate A Cappella tournament and recently been featured on Voices Only, a nationally competitive compilation CD, with their rendition of Jason Mraz's "Geek In The Pink". They write all of their own arrangements and are known for comical background parts and "special parts" or fun harmonies and special solos. The Dodecs perform in fraternities in sororities around campus, do at least one charity show per school term, and were scheduled to perform at Homecoming events and the local Woodstock Inn in the fall of 2016.

The Dodecs go on a tour after every fall term.  Recent destinations have included Hawaii, Orlando, San Francisco, Berkeley (CA), Boston, Chicago, New York City, Dallas, and Washington, D.C.. Tours include shows at Dartmouth alumni events, schools in the area, hotels, and businesses. The Dodecs host and visit several other a cappella groups in the area. The group also attends an annual cabin trip at the end of every academic year.

The Dartmouth Sings
The Dartmouth Sings is one of Dartmouth's gender-inclusive a cappella groups. "Dartmouth's only formerly fictional a cappella group" owes its original name (The Sing Dynasty) to the comedic acuity of Stephen Colbert, who allegedly went to Dartmouth and participated in an a cappella group of the same name.

Since its founding in 2008, the Sings have prided themselves in their commitment to extending membership on the sole basis of vocal excellence and performance. Upholding this standard has continuously distinguished the group as a remarkably diverse and undeniably talented organization on campus.

The members of the Dartmouth Sings perform all of their own arrangements and choreography, and have an extensive repertoire extending beyond pop and folk music, delving into R&B, Motown, musical theater, rap, and Dartmouth traditionals, among others. The Sings draw significant influence from artists such as Regina Spektor, Mumford and Sons, and Sufjan Stevens, while also dabbling in pop icons such as Ariana Grande, Lady Gaga, Nicki Minaj, and Taylor Swift. The group tours the nation annually performing at various venues in cities such as Los Angeles, San Francisco, Washington D.C., San Diego, New York, Chicago, Boston, and Honolulu. In December 2015, the Sing Dynasty was selected to perform at the 74th Pearl Harbor Commemoration Events at Pearl Harbor, Oahu. The following year, The Sings were again invited to perform at the 75th Pearl Harbor Commemoration Events at Pearl Harbor and performed for the Obamas at the White House Annual Holiday Party. The group won the 2015 Colby-Sawyer College A Cappella Off.

The group's first album, Ask Me About My Flannel, was released in the spring of 2013, with a second, "Convocation," released in fall 2018. The group has collaborated with and hosted several other a cappella groups from various colleges across the nation.

The Sings are made up of 21 students of varying backgrounds, interests, Greek houses, and majors. Each fall, offers of membership are extended to selected auditionees after a competitive audition process.

X.ado
X.ado is a co-ed Christian a cappella group. X.ado's name is derived from ancient Greek. The "X" is the Greek letter chi, the first letter in the word Christos, which means "Christ."  The letter by itself was used by early Christians as a symbol for Christ. The "ado" means "to sing to or sing for." Together, they describe X.ado's reason for existence: to sing for Christ.

X.ado was founded by a group of Christian '94s, '95s, and '96s in 1992. The group had seven members, male and female, and lasted for about a year before gradually fading away. The vision didn't die, however, and the group was reborn in the winter of 1995. The first winter tour lasted in Boston for four days during winter break in 1997.

The group's repertoire mainly consists of Christian rock/praise songs, often combined with choreography and a humorous skit. There are some more traditional hymns such as "The Lord Bless You and Keep You" and "And Can it Be?"

Because of the group's religious nature, auditions are held separately from the rest of the a cappella groups on campus, usually a day earlier but still during orientation.

X.ado has also been well represented in the annual "Dartmouth Idol" contest. In the 2008 edition, two members made the semi-finals (while one advanced to the finals) and there were three members in the finals of the 2009 edition—half of the field. X.ado goes on tour after every fall term for about a week to various geographic locations which have included New York City (2007) and Baltimore/D.C. (2008).

Dartmouth Dermatones
In the fall of 1993, the Dermatones debuted in Gross Anatomy with "Only You," dedicated to their classmates and faculty. Since then, the group has grown to 15–25 members.

Other musical organizations
These organizations include the Barbary Coast Jazz Ensemble, Dartmouth Brass Society, Dartmouth Chamber Orchestra, Dartmouth Chamber Singers, Dartmouth College Marching Band, Dartmouth College Glee Club, Dartmouth Gospel Choir, Dartmouth Symphony Orchestra, Dartmouth Wind Symphony, Handel Society of Dartmouth College, and World Music Percussion Ensemble. In addition to official school music groups, there exists a number of student bands on campus. As of 2019, the three most active and well-known are Shark, Moon Unit, and Read Receipts. The group Fake Nudes disbanded at the end of the 2019 school-year following the graduation of the majority of its members.

Dartmouth College Glee Club
A group of more than 40 distinguished choral singers performing classical works, the club's ever-increasing repertory spans five centuries, including many of the masterworks of choral-orchestral literature, fully staged opera, operettas and musicals, a cappella works and the cherished songs of Dartmouth College.

Dartmouth Symphony Orchestra
The Dartmouth Symphony Orchestra (DSO) is the resident orchestra of the Hopkins Center for the Arts at Dartmouth College. Conducted by Anthony Princiotti, the DSO performs standard works from the symphonic repertoire (while also including some works off the beaten path). The 2009–2010 season included Mahler's Symphony No. 2, Rachmaninoff Piano Concerto No. 2, Beethoven Symphony No. 5, and Brahms Symphony No. 3. The DSO's performance of the Rachmaninoff Piano Concerto was performed with Philip Back '10. The 2013–2014 season includes Schumann Piano Concerto, Brahms Symphony No. 4, Tchaikovsky Violin Concerto, Rimsky-Korsakov's Russian Easter Overture, Mussorgsky's Pictures at an Exhibition, Copland's Appalachian Spring, and Berlioz's Symphonie Fantastique.  The season features student soloists from the Class of 2014. In the spring of 2015, the DSO performed Mahler's Sixth Symphony.

The orchestra traveled to Europe (Germany, the Czech Republic and Austria) in December 2008. In December 2014, the orchestra toured in eastern Europe, performing in Budapest, Belgrade and Sarajevo. The DSO performs in the Hopkins Center's Spaulding Auditorium during the fall, winter and spring terms.

Dartmouth Wind Symphony
Consisting mostly of non-music majors, the Dartmouth Wind Symphony (DWS) performs three official concerts a year, one each academic term (except for summer), at the college's performing arts center. The current director is Matthew Marsit.

The DWS also plays joint concerts each winter term with another college or university's wind ensemble.  Past exchanges have taken place with Yale, MIT, McGill, and the New England Conservatory.  On these exchanges, the DWS plays one half of the concert while the visiting school plays the other. The DWS also visits the other school and plays half the concert there.

The DWS has hosted many special guests for its concerts, including the New York Philharmonic's Phil Smith, and the long-running star of Broadway's Phantom of the Opera, Ted Keegan.  These guests usually play a few selections with the Wind Symphony as well as solo pieces on their own.

Dartmouth Brass Society
Founded in 2001, the Dartmouth Brass Society is a student-run organization with a membership of over twenty brass instrumentalists. It has several component groups, including brass quintets and trombone quartets. Certain groups receive professional coaching in conjunction with the Music Department's for-credit chamber music program.

The DBS has played original compositions by Dartmouth students and often collaborates with the Dartmouth Chamber Orchestra. Its performances feature a variety of works, ranging from baroque to contemporary music.

Dartmouth Chamber Orchestra
Founded as an offshoot of the Music Department's conducting class, the Dartmouth Chamber Orchestra was founded by Katherine Domingo '96 and has become famous as the school's only student-run orchestra.  A student conductor and president choose the music and set the venues for each concert, which consist of a wide variety of music.

The Dartmouth Chamber Orchestra holds three concerts per term - in the fall, the DCO usually takes on a more traditional repertoire (such as Haydn, Rossini, and Mozart), while in the spring, the Chamber Orchestra prides itself on performing composition from Dartmouth student composers. In the winter, the group takes a more liberal approach, playing whatever the conductor chooses. Past selections have included Benjamin Britten's "Young Persons' Guide to the Orchestra," Star Wars, video game music, and classic waltzes.

Though the group receives no official funding from the school, the Dartmouth Chamber Orchestra maintains its presence on campus through help from various grants from the Music Department and the Committee on Student Organizations.

Dartmouth College Marching Band

The DCMB is the oldest marching band in the Ivy League; it was formed during the 1890s as "The Dartmouth Band".  The DCMB's instrumentation is chiefly traditional, but also features a keg section (hit with a stick as a percussion instrument) and kazoos. During the fall, the band performs at all home football games, as well as a few away games. The DCMB also has a winter band that performs at hockey, basketball, and other events.  The band continues to play traditional fight songs that have been played at Dartmouth football games for nearly a century.

Drama and performance

Soul Scribes
The Dartmouth Soul Scribes, founded in 2004, is the only group at Dartmouth dedicated exclusively to performance poetry. It has enjoyed much popularity and success since its inception. The Scribes have made multiple appearances at the national College Unions Poetry Slam Invitational and were the 2012 champions of the Wade Lewis Poetry Slam Invitational (the nation's second largest collegiate slam). The group has opened for a number of world-renowned slam poets including Roger Bonair-Agard, Derrick C. Brown, Andrea Gibson, Sarah Kay (poet), Phil Kaye, Taylor Mali, Anis Mojgani, Shihan, and Buddy Wakefield. Membership in the Soul Scribes is open; there are no auditions. On campus, the group hosts writing and performance workshops, open mics, and competitive slams. They perform at a variety of venues and events across campus and frequently collaborate with other student organizations

Casual Thursday
Casual Thursday is an improv comedy troupe that performs at Dartmouth. Casual Thursday usually focuses on shortform games in their shows, although the group also performs sketch shows at least twice a year. The group was founded in 2001, by members of the Class of 2004. Casual Thursday regularly visits other colleges and travels to other states, often participating in professional improv comedy workshops.

Sit-Down Tragedy (stand-up comedy group) 
Founded in the fall of 2007 by Jack-O-Lantern editor-in-chief Fred Meyer, the Dartmouth Stand-Up Comedy Group received college recognition on February 13, 2008, after having existed unofficially for a few months beforehand, holding open mics at restaurants around campus. In the winter of 2009, after electing a new president, the group re-christened itself "Sit-Down Tragedy," and has continued to grow in popularity. Unlike an improv group, Sit-Down Tragedy holds weekly meetings to workshop and plan material before it ends up getting performed on stage. Aside from performing comedy themselves, the group regularly invites professional comedians to come perform along with them. Past performers including Dartmouth Alumna Aisha Tyler, and popular gay comedian Vidur Kapur. Many performers end up coming from the (relatively) nearby Boston area, like Dan Boulger, Zach Sherwin, Dana Jay Bein and Mehran Khaghani.

Dog Day Players
The Dog Day Players, established in 1995, is Dartmouth's oldest improv comedy group. Successor to the original improv group founded in the 1980s "Said and Done" which included alums Al Samuels '88 (Writer-Director of 50 Shades! The Musical Parody, Sports Action Network, Second City) Andrew Asnes '87 (Dancer-aul Taylor Dance Co, Broadway Producer-The Color Purple Musical, Legally Blonde the Musical, 50 Shades! The Musical Parody), Rachel Dratch '88 (SNL), Mindy Kaling '01 (The Office), and more. Dog Day's shows tend to be in longform style.  The group, which usually numbers between 10 and 12, regularly performs on campus, participates in comedy festivals and workshops, and visits other collegiate improv groups. Dog Day holds auditions for new members each fall.

The Harlequins
The Harlequins is the only student-run musical production organization at Dartmouth College.  It was founded in 1995 and produces musicals.  Its first production was Godspell, a musical about the new testament written by Stephen Schwartz, performed in Dartmouth Hall in 1995.  Other productions have included Guys and Dolls, A Funny Thing Happened on the Way to the Forum (2001) by Stephen Sondheim, Taxi-Cabaret (2002), Jesus Christ Superstar, Love, Sex and Everything in Between (a revue done in fall, 2002), A Chorus Line (2003), Little Shop of Horrors (2003) by Alan Menken, That's Entertainment (a revue done in fall, 2003), The Last Five Years (By Jason Robert Brown) (2004), Pippin (2004) (By Stephen Schwartz), You're A Good Man, Charlie Brown (2004) and the first summer show A Summer Revue produced in 2004. The revue consisted of 18 musical numbers from musicals as diverse as Adam Guettel's Myths and Hymns, Cy Coleman's City of Angels, Andrew Lloyd Webber's Sunset Boulevard, and Jason Robert Brown's Songs For a New World. , the group consists of over 300 student singers, instrumentalists, production staff-members and officers, and hopes to put on additional shows at Dartmouth each term in the coming year.

The Dartmouth Rude Mechanicals
The Dartmouth Rude Mechanicals (TDRM) is a highly competitive student-run Shakespeare company that focuses on communal casting, directing, production and acting among its members.  Founded in the fall of 2008, the Rude Mechanicals produce one Shakespeare play per term in minimalist fashion using the First Folio, no set, and costumes mostly garnered from members' closets. The Rude Mechanicals' productions have included such favorites as Twelfth Night, As You Like It, Macbeth, A Midsummer Night's Dream, The Tempest, Much Ado About Nothing, Hamlet, Cymbeline, and The Merry Wives of Windsor. In 2010, the Council on Student Organizations (COSO) presented the Rude Mechanicals with the award for "Best New Student Organization."  The Rude Mechanicals audition for new members at the end of the fall term and occasionally at the end of the winter term.

Publications

Dartmouth features many magazines funded by its Council on Student Organizations (COSO) as well as at least two independently funded newspapers, The Dartmouth and the Dartmouth Review.  For more information on college publications, see Dartmouth College publications. Dartmouth's "Collegiate Journal of Art History" is the first such academic art history journal in the country.

Political groups
Campus political groups regularly host events for presidential candidates and other well-known politicians in conjunction with Dartmouth's Nelson A. Rockefeller Center for Public Policy. Groups occasionally collaborate in organizing dinner discussions, debates, and events with a bipartisan scope. The New Hampshire primary, which occurs every four years, does much to boost participation in these groups, but the politically aware student body (of whom more than ten percent major in government) augments this considerably.

Dartmouth College Democrats
With most Dartmouth students identifying as more liberal, the College Democrats has the largest membership of the three partisan political groups on campus. In addition to working on state and national political campaigns, the group hosts speakers and occasionally lobbies lawmakers when legislation relating to college students is up for debate. In April 2006, the group founded the College Democrats of New Hampshire, a state federation made up of College Democrats organizations at colleges throughout New Hampshire.

Dartmouth College Republicans
One of the primary outlets for politically conservative and libertarian students on campus is the College Republicans. The organization hosts visiting lecturers, conducts awareness campaigns, and mobilizes students to vote and work on the campaigns of local candidates. Every four years during the New Hampshire Primary, this group organizes forums for presidential candidates and volunteers to work on state and national campaigns. The New Hampshire Federation of College Republicans was founded by the Dartmouth College Republicans.

Dartmouth College Libertarians
The College Libertarians are a group of Dartmouth students committed to the cause of liberty who host events and invite speakers to campus to discuss libertarian issues. The organization participates in DPU debates and encourages students on campus to critically examine the present nature of the two-party system, which it views as a false dichotomy toward political discourse.

Dartmouth Political Union
The Dartmouth Political Union was founded by William M. Reicher '22 and Vlado Vojdanovski '22 in the Dartmouth Fall term of 2018. Since then, the club has grown to have over three hundred members.

The DPU is a “nonpartisan student-run organization dedicated to providing a forum for respectful political discourse on campus” by “promoting facts, seeking nuance, and challenging preconceptions.” The DPU “works to bridge partisan divides and foster respect for the freedom of speech among the Dartmouth student community”.

The DPU has aimed to host engaging speakers, who have included co-founder of the Black Panther Party Bobby Seale, former CIA Director John Deutch, Pulitzer-winning journalist Glenn Greenwald, and linguist and political Activist Noam Chomsky. The DPU has also had success in organizing student-led debates and viewing parties for important events. DPU event attendance is among the highest of any club at Dartmouth College.

Rockefeller Center
The Nelson A. Rockefeller Center for Public Policy and the Social Sciences sponsors numerous dinner discussion groups with strong followings including PoliTALK, Daniel Webster Legal Society, Women in Leadership, Agora, First Year Forum, and Vox Masters.

Miscellaneous organizations

Dartmouth Consulting Group
The Dartmouth Consulting Group (DCG) is Dartmouth College’s student-run consulting organization. DCG provides a wide range of services, from strategy to implementation, for businesses in the Upper Valley region of New Hampshire and Vermont. Past engagements have varied from working with local startups to aiding in multi-million dollar expansion projects.

Dartmouth Emergency Medical Services
Dartmouth EMS is a student run Basic Life Support (BLS) unit licensed by the State of New Hampshire. D-EMS provides emergency medical services to Dartmouth College, and are available for standby coverage throughout the Upper Valley. Dartmouth EMS is dedicated to the safety of Dartmouth community members and visitors. Additionally, the group strives to provide as many educational opportunities as possible.

D-EMS provides on-call campus coverage to the campus. Crews are available for radio dispatch during on-call hours to medical emergencies on campus. D-EMS also provides standby coverage throughout the Upper Valley to be on-call at events with increased risk of injury, especially at college athletic and other special events.

D-EMS provides training in first aid and CPR (from the AHA), as well as sponsor EMT classes. Training is available to students and departments, and any other community members. D-EMS also maintains the campus Automated External Defibrillator (AED) program, as well as providing training for their proper use.

Members possess a wide range of certifications, including EMT, Healthcare Provider CPR, First Aid, and Incident Command System certifications and they engage in numerous training and continuing education opportunities throughout the year to maintain and sharpen skills.

Dartmouth Outing Club

The Dartmouth Outing Club (DOC) is the oldest and largest collegiate outing club in the United States, founded in 1909 to stimulate interest in winter sports.

The DOC includes many subgroups, including:
Bait and Bullet
The Big Green Bus
Cabin and Trail
Cycling Club
Environmental Studies Division
Ledyard Canoe Club
Dartmouth Mountaineering Club
Dartmouth Ski Patrol
Farm and Field
Snowboarding Club
People of Color Outdoors 
Winter Sports Club
Women in the Wilderness

Dartmouth Billiards Student Organization

The Dartmouth Billiards Student Organization (DBSO) provides Dartmouth students an opportunity to participate in pocket billiards in a structured fashion. Founded in 2022, the organization offers all Dartmouth students the opportunity to pursue their passion for billiards and to compete in intracollegiate and intercollegiate competitions. The club practices once per week, presently on Tuesdays at 8 P.M., with individualized workshops available at personal request. At the end of each quarter, the organization hosts an 8-Ball Tournament with cash prizes. The group also actively seeks to improve 8 Ball Hall, the pool hall located in the basement of Dartmouth's Collis Center. In the future, the organization seeks to participate in billiards leagues against other schools in New England, and to recruit and train Dartmouth students for these competitions.

Friday Night Rock
Friday Night Rock is an active student group that brings independent bands and musicians to Dartmouth several times every term for concerts and provides an important alternative social space for students. Concerts are held in Sarner Underground.

Dartmouth Broadcasting

Dartmouth Broadcasting is a self-supported student organization at Dartmouth College that operates two radio stations, WFRD-FM and WDCR-AM.  WFRD is one of the few fully commercial college radio stations in the United States and its programming and operation are handled by a nine-member student directorate in consultation with an Alumni Overseers Committee that includes members from ClearChannel Communications, ESPN and PBS, as well as representatives of the college administration.  WDCR is a standard college multi-format station that operates off revenues from ad sales on WFRD.

Dartmouth Broadcasting alumni include famed radio presenters Paul Gambaccini (BBC), Anthony Burton (BBC Radio 3) and John Gambling (WABC New York).  Several alumni of the Dartmouth Broadcast News have enjoyed long careers in journalism, including Pulitzer Prize winner David Shipler who interviewed Dr. Martin Luther King Jr. during his visit to Dartmouth.

Dartmouth Film Society
The Dartmouth Film Society is one of the country's oldest student-run film societies.  Established in 1949 by Maurice Rapf, class of '35, and Blair Watson class of '21, the DFS is still thriving today as the hub of film culture at Dartmouth College and in the Upper Valley.

Committed to fostering a greater appreciation and understanding of cinema, the DFS provides a program of approximately fifty to be shown each academic term.  These films are all bound together by a common theme; past series have included "The Open Road," a program featuring road movies, and "Breakthroughs," featuring the breakthrough films of various directors, writers, and actors.  The films are projected twice weekly onto the giant 16-by-28-foot screen in the college's arts center auditorium and are open to students, faculty, and the public.  Aside from the films in the program series, the DFS also plays several specials every term; these can range from sneak previews of upcoming films to hard-to-find rarities like a collection of Academy Award nominated short films.

Members of the film society meet once a week to discuss the films exhibited the past week and, at the end of each term, debate series proposals.  Anyone can submit a series, as long as it has a decent variety of older films, new films, documentaries, foreign films, and silents.  The Directorate of the film society, about 25 students and community members, actually vote on the series.

The DFS also organizes annual tributes to worthy film artists.  Such distinguished filmmakers as Andrei Tarkovsky, Meryl Streep, Buck Henry, Werner Herzog, Sean Penn, and Sidney Lumet have all received honors from the DFS.

Dartmouth Mixed Reality
The Dartmouth Mixed Reality (DXR), founded in 2018, is made up of students passionate about Augmented (AR), Virtual (VR), and Mixed Reality (XR). The DXR club is considered as one of the leading research-oriented student clubs in AR/VR/XR technology. The members of the club are represented at leading institutions and events such as Augmented World Expo, Microsoft, Facebook, as well as at startups from all over the world. While the club is open to all undergraduates, full-access is usually restricted only to 'full' members of the club who get access to cutting-edge technology and mentorship from experts around the world.

Dartmouth Forensic Union
The Dartmouth Forensic Union (DFU) is the policy debate team of Dartmouth College.  Considered one of the strongest debate teams in the country, the DFU has had at least one first round qualifier to the National Debate Tournament for 25 years running, and has won the NDT eight times.

Gender Sexuality XYZ
Gender Sexuality XYZ (GSX) is made up of students interested in bringing together the Gay, Lesbian, Bisexual, Transgender, Queer, and Allied communities of Dartmouth College. The Gay Straight Alliance, formed in the spring of 1999, was renamed Gender Sexuality XYZ in the fall of 2007. Their mission is to work together in order to increase understanding and acceptance of gay, lesbian, bisexual, transgender, and queer individuals in society. GSX holds weekly meetings and also coordinates both social and advocacy-related events, including issue-oriented discussions and Day of Silence observations.

Green Key Society
Established in 1921, the Green Key Society is an honorary service organization at Dartmouth College. Green Key helps to run such traditional Dartmouth events as First-Year Orientation, the Bonfire, Homecoming Sweep, Commencement, Green Key Weekend, and many other events including performances, services, and guest speakers

Dartmouth Sexual Assault Peer Advocates
The Sexual Assault Peer Advocate (SAPA) program at Dartmouth College began in the 1980s as an effort to promote awareness about sexual abuse on the Dartmouth campus. SAPAs regularly post a short biography on Dartmouth's BlitzMail bulletins, and students are free to contact them at any time for questions, advice or other help.  SAPAs go through an extensive 40 hours of training where they learn about issues of sexual assault and rape, relationship violence and stalking. This includes medical, legal, social, psychological and information about other resources for victims.  SAPAs' most important role is to act as an "ear" for victims - someone who will listen to and empathize with a victim's experience.  SAPAs are trained to act as a connector for these victims.  They serve to provide information and support, helping victims receive the proper care for their situation.  SAPAs help victims contact counselors and other medical advisors, as well as provide information about legal aspects of the process, including reporting to the Hanover, New Hampshire police and to Safety and Security, Dartmouth's security force.

Dartmouth Union of Bogglers
The Dartmouth Union of Bogglers (DUB) is a college-recognized club that promotes and organizes games of Boggle for members of the Dartmouth community. DUB meets once a week, where members play Boggle and/or Big Boggle and partake in free snacks. DUB was founded in 2004 by Sylvia Chi and Sarah E. Morton continues to operate .
The bogglers are recognised worldwide for their outstanding boggling skills.

Native Americans at Dartmouth

The Native Americans at Dartmouth (NAD) organization is a voluntary, student-run organization at Dartmouth College.  NAD has represented over 150 tribes since it first began and there are currently approximately 50 active students within the organization.  These students meet every Thursday of the term at the Native American House to determine their agenda of activities for the term. Activities may include faculty dinners, dance parties, community service, and academic workshops.  NAD's main goals include working on joint concerns of their group and planning to improve the environment for NAD campus-wide. In the winter of 2004, Native Americans at Dartmouth held and hosted the first annual All Ivy Native Conference. The conference was a weekend-long event that included a career fair, academic workshops, and resume and job search workshops, as well as presenting many post-graduation options.  Native Americans at Dartmouth also plan an annual spring Dartmouth College Powwow on the weekend of Mother's Day. NAD also partakes in a group called the Inter-Community Council which is dedicated to uniting all the minority organizations on the campus of Dartmouth College in an effort to be a support for the organizations.

Dartmouth Society of Investment and Economics
The Dartmouth Society of Investment and Economics was founded in the fall of 2005 and is the primary economics and finance related student organization on campus. The club holds weekly economic discussions that are open to the public, as well as bringing in alumni speakers, hosting stock-picking competitions, and organizing a Fed Challenge team.

Collis Governing Board
Collis Governing Board, often known as CGB on campus, was created in 1980 at the inception of the Collis Center to give students a voice in the management of their student union.  Today, it is actively involved in student programming and capital movements to the Collis building along with advocacy of student interests within the center.  The board's jurisdiction includes Collis, Thayer's Hovey Lounge, and Robinson Hall.  In 2006, the group also took over programming for Lone Pine Tavern, a student dining and recreational facility where its student musical programming has become popular. In 2009, the Collis Governing Board supervised Lone Pine Tavern's transformation into One Wheelock, a coffee bar, study lounge, and social space with frequent musical and theatrical performances.

Undergraduate societies
Dartmouth recognizes two non-Greek undergraduate societies: Panarchy and Amarna. Both societies are co-ed, open, non-exclusive, and do not conduct "rush" activities. Like the Greek organizations, Panarchy and Amarna function as social and residential communities; however, the undergraduate societies are separate from the college's Co-ed, Fraternity and Sorority (CFS) system and unlike affinity houses (like La Casa or Foley House) remain unaffiliated from any academic department. Both Panarchy and Amarna have a strong founding commitment to member equality regardless of gender or seniority.

Amarna

Amarna Undergraduate Society was founded as a newly formed undergraduate society in early 1994. Amarna's formation was inspired by a vocal mine yours debate on the Greek system and Panarchy's recognition as an undergraduate society. The college gave Amarna the house at 23 East Wheelock Street, where the society remains today. Named after a Middle Egyptian society led by King Akhenaten and Queen Nefertiti, Amarna is known for its Monday Night Dinners with professors and its signature "Wine and Cheese" party.

Panarchy

Panarchy became the first college-recognized undergraduate society in September 1993. Panarchy is historically prefigured by Beta Psi, which was absorbed by Phi Kappa Psi (or "Phi Psi"), a national fraternity founded at Dartmouth in 1896. Early in the 20th century, the fraternity bought the house at 9 School Street, which was built in 1835 and where the organization continues to reside today. In response to what was perceived as racial prejudice on the part of Phi Kappa Psi's national leadership, Dartmouth's Phi Kappa Psi separated from the national and renamed itself as Phi Sigma Psi in 1967. After years of welcoming female exchange-student boarders, on the first day Dartmouth admitted women in 1972 Phi Psi became the first Dartmouth Greek house to go co-ed. In 1991, the organization changed its name to "Phi Psi/Panarchy".  In 1993 the college recognized Panarchy as an undergraduate society independent from the Greek system. Panarchy is known for hosting its "Great Gatsby" party.

Senior societies
Student literary or fraternal societies of Dartmouth College date back to 1783. Starting in the late nineteenth century, students began creating societies for each of the four class years.  Only the senior societies survive from those early class societies, and new ones have been added in recent years.  Almost all keep their membership secret until Commencement, when members of most senior societies may be identified by their carved canes.  Approximately 25% of the senior class members are affiliated with a senior society today.

Abaris
Abaris was founded in 1996 as a society to recognize both male and female campus leadership, with the mission of uniting diverse and dynamic individuals to create change in the Dartmouth community. The society takes its name from Abaris the Hyperborean, who, according to Greek mythology, served as a priest and messenger for the god Apollo. With the powers of prophesy and healing, endowed unto him by a golden arrow, Abaris traveled throughout his land, performing great deeds for his people. The society is a diverse set of campus leaders, and is known for a combination of revelry, mischief, and philanthropic endeavors. Membership in Abaris remains secret until graduation. Many notable Dartmouth alumni were involved with Abaris during their final undergraduate years.

Andromeda
Andromeda is an all-female society that was recognized by the college in 2013. The group takes its name from the Andromeda galaxy and brings together bold women from across campus.

Antheia
Antheia is an all-female society that brings together a select group of diverse and empowered women from all across campus. The group is named after Antheia, the Greek Goddess of flower wreaths and love. Members carry canes at graduation.

Atlas
Founded in 1989, Atlas is a co-ed society that emphasizes character and intellect in the selection of its members. Its historical mission is "to augment its members' educations through dialogue about the world and their place in it."

Casque and Gauntlet
Casque and Gauntlet (also known as C&G) was founded in 1886 as the second permanent senior society at Dartmouth and continues to operate .  In 1893 the group moved to its current location at 1 South Main Street, a house built by Dr. Samuel Alden in 1823, and the society installed a rear addition designed by alumnus and Paterson, New Jersey architect Fred Wesley Wentworth in 1915.  Tapping continues in the traditional method and C&G membership is co-ed, exclusive and not secret.  Notable members of past delegations include Theodor Seuss Geisel (Dr. Seuss), Nelson Rockefeller and Hank Paulson.

Chimera
Chimera is a college-recognized society that accepts members of all genders. The society aims to bring together a diverse group of leaders from all sectors of campus with the goal of improving campus life. In recent years, the society has focused itself around mental health activism. Membership is essentially secret: Members may self-disclose membership but are forbidden from sharing the identity of other members. A small number of members are selected from an application process, though the vast majority of members are selected during the traditional "tapping" period. Members carry canes at graduation.

Cobra
Cobra was founded in 1978 as Dartmouth's first all-female society. The society occupies a house on Summer Street.  Cobra focuses on cross-generational mentorship and selects women on the basis of demonstrated leadership within the Dartmouth community and devotion to the college.

Dragon

Dragon was founded in 1898 and continues to operate .  Dragon is said to be the most secret of Dartmouth's senior societies, as its members do not carry canes at commencement.  Little is known about the traditions of Dragon, however, its members are thought to be the presidents of Dartmouth's sports clubs.

Epeios

Established as an elaborate ruse in the fall of 2000, the Order of Epeios was invented as a means for comic relief.  Two friends enlisted the help of approximately 20 other Dartmouth students to induct two other friends (and three "planted" candidates)into a hypothetical Senior Society.  After 4 weeks, development of a detailed backstory (with roots in 1789 French Revolutionary Resistance), participation in The "Quest of Worthiness", and several intricately staged ceremonies; the practical joke was revealed to the intended subjects.  The name is a misspelled version of the name "Epeius" to honor his building of the Trojan Horse (the Original prank). Thus, the Society was officially founded with open membership to all those who value humor and respect in a dynamic equilibrium.

Ferox
Ferox is an all-female society unrecognized by Dartmouth College. Its mission involves the character development of its members and a focus on social responsibility. Membership remains secret until graduation.

Fire and Skoal

Founded in 1975, Fire and Skoal was Dartmouth's first co-educational senior society.

Griffin
The school officially recognized the existence of the Griffin Society in October 1995. The co-ed society often includes athletic captains and Greek leadership.  Notable members include Olympic gold medalist shot putter Adam Nelson.

Jackal

Jackal has remained one of Dartmouth's most secretive societies. Jackal is an all-male society that is unrecognized by the college, with a reputation for pranks, often directed toward other societies. Little else is known about the Jackals as they do not have discrete public practices like the other all-male societies. Many of the members are varsity athletes and presidents of fraternities on campus.

Ministry
Ministry is an all-female secret society founded in 2015. Ministry is unrecognized by the college and takes pride in extending exclusive membership to a diverse group of campus leaders.
Members carry canes at graduation. The society often consists of sorority presidents and female leaders across campus.

Olympus
Olympus is a co-ed Dartmouth Secret Society founded in 2013. The selection process involves identifying student leaders from across campus, and members carry canes during commencement.

Order of the Sirens
Order of the Sirens was originally founded in 1983 as a co-ed secret society known as "The Order".. The women of “The Order” are commonly referred to as "Sirens". Members carry canes during graduation and are known for their signature tattoo.

Osiris
Osiris was founded in 2016 as an unrecognized co-ed secret society. The society takes its name from the Egyptian god of the afterlife, the underworld, and rebirth. Members are identifiable by a characteristic tattoo and carry canes at graduation. Members are involved in various organizations on campus, from athletic teams, to Greek houses, to campus leadership.

Palaeopitus
Palaeopitus Senior Society was founded in 1899 by Edward Hall, class of 1892.  The name Palaeopitus is a derivative of the Greek word for "Old Pine".  Initially a secret society, Palaeopitus has operated with their membership publicly known in recent years.  Membership is regarded as eldest of the "current crop of 'pines'".  Subsequently, leaders of communities on campus generally make up the membership. Unlike other societies, members may belong to other societies as well.

Phoenix
Phoenix was founded in 1982 and is the second-oldest all female senior society.  The society draws from a cross section of women leaders to carry on its mission of promoting co-education at Dartmouth. In 2020, Phoenix officially opened its membership to non-male leaders, and began tapping nonbinary undergraduates as well.

Phrygian
Founded in 2005, Phrygian is an all-male Secret Society at Dartmouth. Its name comes from the Phrygian Cap, a symbol of liberty. It is devoted to philosophies of individual liberty.

Pyxis
Taking its name from a triad of stars in the southern sky, this all-female secret society is the oldest all-female senior society founded in 1971. It acquires its members from across Dartmouth's campus, including leaders of various organizations on campus, athletic teams, and Greek houses. While little is known about this exclusive group, its members can be identified by a small, chic tattoo. Notable alumni include Meryl Streep, who spent her senior Fall at Dartmouth College as part of the 12 College Exchange.

Sphinx

Sphinx was founded in 1885 and continues to operate  as the oldest senior society at Dartmouth. In 1903 the group moved to its current location on East Wheelock Street, a mausoleum designed by Manchester, New Hampshire architect William Butterfield, and during the 1920s the society installed a rear addition designed by noted campus planner Jens Fredrick Larson. Members carry identifying canes at graduation.

Tyger
Originally founded in 1892 and named in an homage to the William Blake poem "The Tyger. While not officially recognized by Dartmouth College, there is a consensus that Tyger still operates today.

Greek organizations

Dartmouth College is host to many Greek organizations and a significant percentage of the undergraduate student body is active in Greek life.  In 2005, the school stated that 1,785 students were members of a fraternity, sorority, or coeducational Greek house, about 60 percent of the eligible student body.  Dartmouth College was among the first institutions of higher education to desegregate fraternity houses in the 1950s, and was involved in the movement to create coeducational Greek houses in the 1970s.  In the early 2000s, campus-wide debate focused on whether the Greek system at Dartmouth would become "substantially coeducational", but most houses retain single-sex membership policies.  Currently, Dartmouth College extends official recognition to fifteen all-male fraternities, eight all-female sororities, and three coeducational Greek houses.

Notes
Cited references

References

 
Student organizations by university or college in the United States